Borden Chase (January 11, 1900 – March 8, 1971) was an American writer.

Career

Early jobs
Born Frank Fowler, he left school at fourteen went through an assortment of jobs, including driving for gangster Frankie Yale and working as a sandhog on the construction of New York City's Holland Tunnel, where he worked with union leader Norman Redwood.

He turned to writing, first short stories and novels, and later, screenplays. He changed his name to Borden Chase, allegedly getting his nominal inspiration from Borden Milk and Chase Manhattan Bank.

Novelist
Chase wrote a story based on his Holland Tunnel experience with Edward Doherty. Film rights were bought by Fox Films who hired Chase to adapt the book and act as a technical adviser. The result was Under Pressure (1935), directed by Raoul Walsh.
Chase later adapted it into the novel East River. (It was later filmed as "High Air" for Screen Directors Playhouse in 1956.)

Fox bought another story by Chase, Midnight Taxi (1937). Universal bought his novel Hells' Kitchen Has a Pantry and filmed it as The Devil's Party (1938).

Fox bought another Chase story, Blue White and Perfect (1937) and turned it into a Michael Shayne film, Blue, White and Perfect (1942). His 1939 story Dr Broadway provided the basis for Anthony Mann's first film, Dr. Broadway (1942). Another 1939 story Pay to Learn was filmed as The Navy Comes Through (1942).

Harrigan's Kid (1943) was based on his novel.

Screenwriter
Chase worked on the screenplay for Destroyer (1943). For Republic Pictures he wrote the John Wayne film The Fighting Seabees (1944) based on his own story.

In 1944, Chase signed a contract with RKO to write a screenplay based on his unpublished story That Man Malone at $10,000 a week. He provided the story and screenplay for MGM's This Man's Navy (1945) starring Wallace Beery, then did another original for Wayne at Republic, Flame of the Barbary Coast (1945).

Republic also made I've Always Loved You (1946), from screenplay by Chase based on his story Concerto, which in turn was based on the career of his first wife.

Chase wrote Tycoon (1947) for Wayne at RKO, based on a novel by C E Scoggins, then provided the story for a Columbia Western, The Man from Colorado (1949).

Red River
Chase received great critical acclaim for Red River (1948), where he contributed to the screenplay, based on his novel Blazing Guns on the Chisholm Trail. Directed by Howard Hawks and starring Wayne and Montgomery Clift, the film was a huge success and earned Chase an Academy Award nomination as well as a $50,000 fee.

During Chase's 1949 divorce, his soon-to-be ex-wife reported that the least Chase had earned was $30,000 year and that the most he had earned had been $250,000.

That year he was reportedly writing a film for James Cagney, Far Island.

For most of the 1950s Chase worked on Westerns. He was one of many writers on the Errol Flynn saga Montana (1950). More notable was Winchester '73 (1950), directed by Mann and starring James Stewart. He also wrote The Great Jewel Robber (1950) for Warners.

At Universal, Chase worked on the script for the remake of Iron Man (1951), a boxing film. He wrote another Western for Mann and Stewart, Bend of the River (1952), and did Lone Star (1952) for Clark Gable at MGM; MGM paid $60,000 for his story for the latter.

Chase wrote The World in His Arms (1952), a sailing adventure, for Raoul Walsh at Universal. He did something in a similar vein, Sea Devils (1953), based on a Victor Hugo novel.

Chase did a south seas adventure tale for Burt Lancaster, His Majesty O'Keefe (1954) which involved him going on location to Fiji.

He returned to Westerns with Rails Into Laramie (1954), with John Payne; The Far Country (1954) for Mann and Stewart; Vera Cruz (1954) for Lancaster and director Robert Aldrich; and Man Without a Star (1955) for King Vidor and Kirk Douglas.

Television
Chase began writing for TV with "The Windmill" for General Electric Theatre (1955). He wrote the screenplay for Backlash (1956), directed by John Sturges and Night Passage (1957) for Mann and Stewart. The latter also starred Audie Murphy who was in Ride a Crooked Trail (1958), written by Chase.

Chase wrote several episodes of Tales of Wells Fargo (1959), Overland Trail (1960), The Detectives (1961), The Tall Man (1961), Whispering Smith (1961), Bonanza (1962), Route 66 (1962) and The Roy Rogers and Dale Evans Show (1962).

He did some uncredited writing on Mutiny on the Bounty (1962) and wrote Gunfighters of Casa Grande (1964). Chase continued working for TV shows such as Daniel Boone, The Virginian (1964), and Branded (1965).

Final years
Chase's final credits include A Man Called Gannon (1968) (a remake of Man Without a Star) and Backtrack! (1969) (a theatrical release of his 1965 The Virginian episode "We've Lost a Train", which was the backdoor pilot for the 1965–67 series Laredo).

Analysis
According to one film critic, the films that "typify the characters and conflicts associated with Chase's work" were Winchester 73, Bend of the River and The Far Country:First of all, two strong men are involved in an arduous journey across the western terrain, with units of society either contained within the journey itself (as a wagon train) or as various stops along the way (western towns, mining towns, etc.). The primary involvement of the movie is the conflict between two men, who tend to be deeply linked by some common bond... In some cases the conflict is internal, the hero against the evil inside himself. Although Chase created strong females in films... most Chase stories are male conflicts. Chase once said "That I believe is the greatest love story in all of the world. I don't mean sexual. I have always believed that a man can actually love and respect another man more so than he can a woman."... Straightforward dialogue, and absence of pretentious philosophizing, and clearly delineated action mark the story progressions, which culminate in unambiguous resolutions. Any ambiguities lie in the maturity of the characterizations, in which the two men are neither totally good nor totally bad. In this regard, Chase made a major contribution to what is thought of as the "adult" or "psychological" Westerns of the 1950s. The critic elaborated:The Chase Western story is presented in a physical progression across a larger-than-life landscape, an epic journey west which allows forces of good and evil to interact... The issue of the Chase Western script is not whether man will settle the West and live in it. It is assumed he will, or that he already has. The question is more universal and appropriate to modern life: Will the uncivilized forces within man create a Wild West in perpetuity by winning out over his better instincts?

Personal life
Borden Chase and wife Lee Keith had two children: a daughter, Barrie Chase, a now-retired actress and dancer, and a son, Frank Chase (actor). Lee also had a daughter, Pat, from an earlier relationship.

Chase became estranged from his wife in 1948 and they soon divorced. Lee claimed he had an affair with his step-daughter Pat, and that detectives found them in a hotel room together, naked. Chase went on to marry Pat.

Chase was an active member of the Motion Picture Alliance for the Preservation of American Ideals, an anti-Communist group which was active in Hollywood during the years of the Hollywood blacklist.

Chase suffered a stroke on 12 December 1970. He died in March 1971.

The Borden Chase cocktail is named after him.

Chase supported Thomas Dewey in the 1944 United States presidential election.

Filmography

Films

Television

Fiction
East River, New York, 1935.
Sandhog, New York, 1938.
Lone Star, New York, 1942.
Diamonds of Death, New York, 1947.
Blazing Guns on the Chisholm Trail, New York, 1948, as Red River, New York, 1948.
Viva Gringo!, New York, 1961.

Short stories
Blue White and Perfect (1937)
Dr Broadway (1939)
The Called Him Mister (1940)
Concerto

Non fiction
Sandhog: The Way of the Life of the Tunnel Builders, Evanston, Illinois, 1941.

References

External links and sources

1900 births
1971 deaths
American male screenwriters
Place of birth missing
Place of death missing
20th-century American male writers
20th-century American screenwriters